The tribute of 100 virgins was a legendary annual tribute of one hundred virgin maidens paid by the Christian kingdom of Asturias to the Muslim emirate of Córdoba. Fifty were to be of noble birth and fifty commoners. The tribute has been called "historically apocryphal but ideologically accurate... It plays an intriguing role in the formation and affirmation of reconquista ideology in the later Middle Ages, and also remains a powerful site in Spanish national cultural memory to this day."

The origin of the tribute is usually placed in the reign of Mauregatus (783–789). The legend does not appear until after the fabrication of the Privilegio del voto around 1150. This text, which describes the legendary Battle of Clavijo in 834, where Saint James saved the Asturians, claims that as a result the Spaniards owed annual tribute to the cathedral of Saint James in Compostela.

Lucas of Tuy, writing in 1236, describes how Mauregatus "gave many high-born and also low-born maidens [to the Saracens] in marriage due to an agreement with the Saracens so that he might be at peace with them." In 788, Counts Arias and Oveco revolted against king Mauregatus and killed him in revenge for his having granted the Moors such a repulsive tribute. His successor, Bermudo I of Asturias, tried to negotiate for a tribute of money instead. Bermudo was succeeded by Alfonso II of Asturias, nicknamed "the Chaste", who fully rejected the tribute and had to deal with military consequences. He won the Battle of Lutos and killed the Moorish Captain Mugait, thus achieving his goal: no more tribute. The next king, Ramiro I of Asturias, with the help of Bernardo del Carpio defeated the Moors at the (fictitious) Battle of Clavijo. The Moorish rulers were reportedly scared, by the growing military strength of the northern Christians, into giving up demands for the tribute.

There is an implicit attack on the licentiousness of the Moors in this myth, specifically in that what is being demanded was virgins. (The Moors' sexual libertinism, or alleged sexual libertinism, was a key thread in Christian attacks on it and in motivation for the Reconquista.) One of Abd al-Rahman's successors, Abd al-Rahman II, was said to have limited his sexual partners to virgins, i.e., he did not make love with the same woman twice, presumably because he preferred the variety. (See :es:Abderramán II#Familia e hijos.) It should be remembered that the legend of the tribute of the 100 virgins did not begin during the reign of Abd al-Rahman I, but much later.

See also
Sexual slavery
Arab slave trade
Women in Islam

References

Islam and women
Kingdom of Asturias
Sexual slavery
Reconquista
Spanish legends
Islam and slavery
Slaves from al-Andalus